Fendt is a German agricultural machinery manufacturer founded in 1930 by Xaver Fendt in Marktoberdorf, Allgäu region, Germany. Fendt manufactures tractors, combine harvesters, balers, telescopic handlers and row crop planters. It was purchased by AGCO Corporation in 1997.

History 

The craftsman family Fendt traces its history back some 350 years. The family became well known in Allgäu for producing tower clocks, lead strings and violins. The family also farmed as a sideline and had a small trade in agricultural equipment. Johann Georg Fendt, born on 16 August 1868, took over his father Franz Xaver's business in 1898 and began selling and servicing Deutz stationary engines, and in 1928 branched out into agricultural utility machines by building a motorized grass mower.

The first  Dieselross tractor was built in 1930 by the brothers Hermann (1911–1995) and Xaver Fendt (1907–1989) under the guidance of their father Johann Georg Fendt (1868–1933). In 1937, the company became incorporated in the commercial register.

In 1958, a new class of tractor series "ff" series with the types Favorit, Farmer and Fix were launched. The Favorit 1 was trendsetting in transmission design and build.

In 1995, the company introduced its Vario Class, featuring innovative gearbox (transmission) technology, making it the world's first large tractor with the stepless continuously variable transmission.

Since 1997, Fendt has operated as wholly owned brand of AGCO Corporation and its agricultural equipment reaches a global market.

In 2016, Fendt produced its 250,000th Vario transmission.

In 2018, Fendt had the largest share in the European tractor market. Fendt was the market leader by ownership in Germany  with a share of 24.2% in 2018. In the annual image barometer published by the DLG, in which German contractors and farmers are surveyed about agricultural engineering companies, Fendt took first place in 2013 with 99.3 out of a possible 100 points.

CLIMMAR, an organization that publishes annual Dealer Satisfaction Index for nearly all Ag Equipment brands, has placed Fendt at an average measure of at least 14.1 in 8 of the last 10 years of survey (2011-2021) out of a maximum index of 15. The company is a member of the VDMA, Department of Agricultural Engineering.

As of 2022 Fendt showcases a product range that includes tractors, forage harvesters, combine harvesters, self-propelled sprayers, hay tools, row-crop planters, front end tractor loaders, and telescoping material handlers.

Product range 

Fendt offers the following types of equipment:

 Forage equipment including forage wagons, tedders, mowers and rakes are badged under the Fendt brand after Fella was acquired by AGCO in 2011.
 Large Square Balers formerly Hesston branded, are now marketed under the Fendt brand since being acquired by AGCO.
 Planters for placement of row-crops

Finishing up the product line are:

 Forage harvesters  which use Kemper headers
 Self-Propelled Sprayers
 tractor-mounted loaders
 telescoping material handlers or tele-handlers
 and tractors modified for the municipalities and forestry sectors.

Tractors 

E100 Vario is a 75-kW / 100 hp. electric tractor. It can operate up to 10 hours under actual load.

Combines

Large Square Balers

Planters

Forage Harvesters

Plant Protection Equipment

Material Handling Equipment

Technology

Vario Transmission 

The Vario transmission was first developed in the 1970s, but due to excessive noise of the hydraulic portion of the transmission and lack of engineering production methods that had not yet been invented, it was not seen on a production tractor until 1995, when Fendt launched the revolutionary Fendt 926 Vario.  This was the first ever stepless transmission to be launched in the tractor market, and is patented to be the only truly stepless transmission when it was first developed. Competitors were unable to make a transmission as advanced as a Fendt Vario at the time with a hydrostatic transmission as the only real competition, however, these soon fell out of favor.  Since its initial announcement and release, manufacturers such as ZF, John Deere and CNH group have also developed their own versions of this type of transmission.

Fendt's infinitely variable transmission (IVT) differs from a continuously variable transmission (CVT) as an IVT can be traveling at 0.0 km/h whilst the transmission is engaged and not in neutral. The IVT/CVT gearbox is widely regarded as one of the most fuel-efficient gearbox types on the agricultural market prompting nearly all other major manufacturers to develop their own system as it is able to combine more precise ground speed selection by the user with an increase in fuel-efficiency.

Variations can be found on other AGCO tractor brands such as Massey Ferguson.  The gearbox may be the same however the individual brands have different controls/ joysticks and may have different ECU software.

The first generation of Vario transmissions were named for their primary inventor, Hans Marschall and the different classes of the transmission were labeled in honor of him using the format of "MLxxx" where the x characters would indicate how many kilowatts of power could be transferred through the transmission. (i.e. the original Fendt 926 Favorit Vario featured an ML200 Vario Transmission which could transfer 200 kW or 268 maximum horsepower through it)

Tractor Management System 
In 2004, following the paradigm-shift of the Vario transmission, the next large innovation that Fendt delivered was the ability for the tractor gearbox/transmission and the engine to communicate with one another based on parameters set by the operator that allowed the machine to command only as much engine power as needed to complete the commanded task; a concept that was branded as Vario TMS or Tractor Management System.

VarioGrip 
Fendt pioneered the idea and implementation of the first tire pressure monitoring and control system for use on an agricultural tractor.  It was developed in the late 1980s and first released in an open-loop feedback system offering in 2015 on the Fendt 800, 900, and 1000 Vario Series tractors.

Fendt iD Low Engine Speed Concept 
Beginning with the 1000 series tractor in 2015, Fendt created and implemented the use of the low engine speed concept which was also a world-first for any size agricultural tractor.  While most diesel tractor engines operate at a rated engine RPM of 2000-2300, Fendt engineered the machine to work at its optimum between 1100 and 1500 RPM with a max RPM of 1730.  The results from this innovation resulted in lower fluid consumption, longer service intervals, and longer overall machine life due to less component wear.  With the success of Fendt iD on the 1000 series, it is also now utilized on the 900 Vario Gen 6 and newer series, the 900 Vario MT series, the 1100 Vario MT series, and the 700 Vario Gen 7 and newer series.

The Trisix 

Fendt released a prototype of a new concept tractor at Agritechnica 2007, in Hanover, Germany, called the TriSix nicknamed "Mobydick" and boasting  and six-wheel drive.

The front axle and the rearmost steer the tractor, and as the speed of the tractor increases, the amount of steering input on the rear axle reduces to make it safer. It also completely locks out when in transport mode and with some implements.

To handle the horsepower the Trisix has two of the company's trademark Vario transmissions, which push the machine up to a top speed of 60 km/h (38 mph). Fendt has not confirmed the production of this machine, and it remains in the prototype stage. The axles and backbone tube are from Tatra 815 series trucks and the 6x6 Tatra-based tractor concept was patented in 1997 by Farma Josef Dvorak of Tábor, Czech Republic.

Appearances in media 
A Fendt 930 Vario was shown on BBC's Top Gear, where host James May chose a 930 Vario. It was driven by The Stig round the Top Gear Test Track, and did a time of 3:28.4, the second slowest time round the track.  The Fendt 930 Vario does however report a top speed of 37.5 mph, much faster compared to similar competitor's tractors.

The Fendt 716 also appeared on BBC1 Scotland, on the program Countryfile, where world-class Fendt Driver, Steven Brown, of Inverdovat Farm, won the annual Scottish Fendt Ploughing Match, receiving a prize of £5,000.

Fendt tractors have appeared in the widely-popular Farming Simulator 2008, Farming Simulator 2009, Farming Simulator 17, Farming Simulator 19 and Farming Simulator 22 games.

See also 
 Deutz-Fahr
 Fendt Caravan (formerly a part of Fendt)
 Hanomag
 Monarch Tractor

References

External links 

 

AGCO
Agricultural machinery manufacturers of Germany
Tractor manufacturers of Germany
Electric tractors
German companies established in 1930
Companies based in Bavaria
1997 mergers and acquisitions